Belbadda (also spelled Balbadda) is a village in Meharama CD block in Godda subdivision of Godda district in the Indian state of Jharkhand.

Geography

Location                                             

Overview
Rajmahal coalfield is shown in the map. The entire area is overwhelmingly rural with only small pockets of urbanisation.

Note: The full screen map is interesting. All places marked on the map are linked and you can easily move on to another page of your choice. Enlarge the map to see what else is there – one gets railway links, many more road links and so on.

Demographics
According to the 2011 Census of India, Belbadda had a total population of 3,024, of which 1,525 (50%) were males and 1,499 (50%) were females. Population in the age range 0–6 years was 482. The total number of literate persons in Belbadda was 1,487 (72.66% of the population over 6 years).

Civic administration

Police station
Belbadda police station serves Meharama CD block.

Education
Government High School Balbadda is a Hindi-medium coeducational institution established in 1950. It has facilities for teaching from class IX to class XII.

Kasturba Gandhi Balika Vidyalaya Meherama is a Hindi-medium girls only institution established in 2006. It has facilities for teaching from class VI to class XII.

References

Villages in Godda district